Ken "Duro" Ifill is the American CEO of Desert Storm Records and a record producer.

Career

Early career
In the mid-1990s, Duro served as an intern engineer for Q-Tip during the recording of Mobb Deep's The Infamous album.

Desert Storm Records
In 1997, Duro, DJ Clue, and Skane Dolla (DJ Clue's manager) developed Desert Storm Records. The label's first major artist is rapper, Fabolous. In September 2001, Fabolous released his debut album Ghetto Fabolous, charting at No. 4 on the Billboard 200. The label was previously distributed through Interscope, Elektra, Atlantic and Sony. The label is currently distributed through Def Jam.

Republic Records
Recently, it was announced that Duro was appointed Senior VP of A&R at Republic Records.

Discography
Ken "Duro" Ifill at Album Credits
Ken "Duro" Ifill credits. AllMusic.

References

External links
Sonicscoop November 6, 2011
"Duro Plugs In to Lexicon". Prosound Network. January 21, 2011.
"US Producer Ken "Duro" Ifill Uses Prism Sound's Orpheus To Create GRAMMY® Winning Records". PrismSound.
Ken "Duro" Ifill at Album Credits
Ken "Duro" Ifill credits. AllMusic.
"Getting the Inside Dope from the Hottest Mixers in Manhattan". Mix. November 1, 1999.
"A Supa Dupa Mixer". Audiohead.net.
"Who is Who: Ken (Duro) Ifill". Beastiemania.
Republic Records Names Ken 'Duro' Ifill as Senior VP of A&R: Exclusive. Billboard.com

American audio engineers
American music industry executives
American record producers
Grammy Award winners
Living people
Desert Storm Records artists
Year of birth missing (living people)